Daniel Pennac (real name Daniel Pennacchioni, born 1 December 1944 in Casablanca, Morocco) is a French writer.  He received the Prix Renaudot in 2007 for his essay Chagrin d'école.

Daniel Pennacchioni is the fourth and last son of a Corsican and Provençal family. His father was a polytechnicien who became an officer of the colonial army, reaching the rank of general at retirement and his mother, a housewife, was a self-taught reader. His childhood was spent wherever his father was stationed, in Africa (Djibouti, Ethiopia, Algeria, Equatorial Africa), Southeast Asia (Indochina) and France (including La Colle-sur-Loup). His father's love for poetry gave him a taste for books that he quickly devoured in the family library or at school

After studying in Nice he became a teacher. He began to write for children, including his series "La Saga Malaussène", that tells the story of Benjamin Malaussène, a scapegoat, and his family in Belleville, Paris. In a 1997 piece for Le Monde, Pennac stated that Malaussène's youngest brother, Le Petit, was the son of Jerome Charyn's New York detective, Isaac Sidel.

His writing style can be humorous and imaginative as in "La Saga Malaussène", or scholarly, as exemplified by the essay "Comme un roman." His comic Débauche, written jointly with Jacques Tardi, deals with unemployment.

Literary awards
In 1990 Pennac won the "Prix du Livre Inter" for La petite marchande de prose. His 1984 novel L'œil du loup was translated into English as Eye of the Wolf by Sarah Adams – later known as Sarah Ardizzone – and published by Walker Books in 2002; Adams won the biennial British Marsh Award for Children's Literature in Translation in 2005 for that work. In 2002 he won the Grinzane Cavour Prize. In 2007 Pennac won the Prix Renaudot for Chagrin d'école. He won the "Grand Prix Metropolis bleu" in 2008 for his complete work. In 2013 he received an honorary degree in pedagogy from the University of Bologna.

Bibliography

Autobiography
Chagrin d'école Gallimard (2007), 
School Blues Translator Sarah Ardizzone (née Adams), Quercus (2011), 
Schoolpijn Translator Kiki Coumans, Boekerij, De (2010), 
Skolas sāpes Translator Agnese Kasparova, Omnia Mea (2012),

Novels for children
 Cabot-Caboche (1982); Translated into English as Dog, Translator Sarah Adams, Illustrator Britta Teckentrup, Candlewick (2004)
 L'œil du loup (Eye of the wolf) (1984); Translator Sarah Adams, Illustrator Max Grafe, Walker (2002), ; Illustrator Catherine Reisser, Pocket (1994), 
 Kamo: L'agence Babel (1992)
 L'Évasion de Kamo
 Kamo et moi
 Kamo : L'idée du siècle

Other novels
 Père Noël (1979), with Tudor Eliad (Grasset et Fasquelle)
 Messieurs les enfants (1997)
 Le Dictateur et le hamac (2003)
English The dictator and the hammock, Random House UK, 2006, 
Dutch De dictator en de hangmat, Meulenhof, 2005, Translator Truus Boot
 Merci (2004), he has interpreted it himself at the theater

La Saga Malaussène
 Au bonheur des ogres (1985)
The Scapegoat, Translator Ian Monk, Harvill Press, 1998, 
 La fée carabine (1987)
 The fairy gunmother, Translator Ian Monk, Harvill Press, 1997, 
 La petite marchande de prose (1989)
Write to Kill, Translator Ian Monk, Harvill, 1999, 
 Monsieur Malaussène (1995)
Monsieur Malaussène, Translator Ian Monk, Harvill, 2003
 Monsieur Malaussène au théâtre (1996)
 Des Chrétiens et des maures (1996)
 Aux fruits de la passion (1999)
Passion Fruit, Harvill, 2001,

Essays
 Le service militaire au service de qui ?, (1973) published under his real name Daniel Pennacchioni
Comme un roman, Gallimard, 1992, 
Reads like a novel, Quartet Books, 1994, 
The Rights of the Reader, Translator Sarah Adams, Illustrator Quentin Blake, Candlewick Press, 2008,

Illustrated books
 Les grandes vacances, (photographies) Pennac and Robert Doisneau (2002)
 La vie de famille
 Le sens de la Houppelande
 Vercors d'en haut: La réserve naturelle des hauts-plateaux
 Le grand Rex (1980)
 Némo
 Écrire

Illustrated books for children
 Sahara
 Le Tour du ciel, with the painting from Miró
 Qu'est-ce que tu attends, Marie ?, with the painting from Monet.

Comic books
 La débauche (illustrated by Tardi)
 Tête de nègre

Films on Daniel Pennac 
 "Daniel Pennac, écrire, enseigner, communiquer" directed by Stéphan Bureau (Canada/2009).
 "Daniel Pennac, la Métamorphose du crabe" directed by Charles Castella for the French collection documentary Empreintes of France 5 (Docside/2009).
 Bartleby en coulisses directed by Jérémie Carboni (France Télévisions Distribution/2010).

References

External links

The Rights of the Reader - poster illustrated by Quentin Blake
Interview with Daniel Pennac in Barcelona Metropolis, Spring 2009.

1944 births
Living people
Moroccan emigrants to France
People from Casablanca
Côte d'Azur University alumni
French crime fiction writers
French children's writers
French comics writers
20th-century French novelists
21st-century French novelists
Prix Renaudot winners
Prix du Livre Inter winners
French male screenwriters
French screenwriters
20th-century French essayists
Prix Maison de la Presse winners
French people of Corsican descent
French male novelists
20th-century French male writers
21st-century French male writers
French male non-fiction writers
Taxi drivers